Kunszentmiklós is a district in north-western part of Bács-Kiskun County. Kunszentmiklós is also the name of the town where the district seat is found. The district is located in the Southern Great Plain Statistical Region.

Geography 
Kunszentmiklós District borders with Ráckeve District (Pest County) to the north, Dabas District (Pest County) to the northeast, Kecskemét District to the east, Kiskőrös District and Kalocsa District to the south, Paks District (Tolna County) and Dunaújváros District  (Fejér County) to the west. The number of the inhabited places in Kunszentmiklós District is 9.

Municipalities 
The district has 3 towns and 6 villages.
(ordered by population, as of 1 January 2012)

The bolded municipalities are cities.

Demographics

In 2011, it had a population of 29,998 and the population density was 39/km2.

Ethnicity
Besides the Hungarian majority, the main minorities are the Roma (approx. 900), Slovak (550) and German (150).

Total population (2011 census): 29,998
Ethnic groups (2011 census): Identified themselves: 28,732 persons:
Hungarians: 26,822 (93.35%)
Gypsies: 883 (3.07%)
Slovaks: 555 (1.93%)
Others and indefinable: 472 (1.64%)
Approx. 1,000 persons in Kunszentmiklós District did not declare their ethnic group at the 2011 census.

Religion
Religious adherence in the county according to 2011 census:

Catholic – 9,401 (Roman Catholic – 9,357; Greek Catholic – 43);
Reformed – 8,306;
Evangelical – 656;
other religions – 799; 
Non-religious – 4,363; 
Atheism – 186;
Undeclared – 6,287.

Gallery

See also
List of cities and towns of Hungary

References

External links
 Postal codes of the Kunszentmiklós District

Districts in Bács-Kiskun County